D. lutea may refer to:

 Dahlia lutea, a plant native to Mexico
 Dalea lutea, a prairie clover
 Demequina lutea, a gram-positive bacterium
 Dendronephthya lutea, a soft coral
 Diadora lutea, a jewel beetle
 Dicranomyia lutea, a crane fly
 Dictyophora lutea, an Asian fungus
 Digitalis lutea, a perennial plant
 Diplommatina lutea, a land snail
 Diplopterys lutea, a flowering plant